Ouvry may refer to:

 Frederic Ouvry (1814–1881), English lawyer and antiquary
 Ouvry Lindfield Roberts (1898-1986), senior officer of the British Army and the British Indian Army during World Wars I and II
 Ouvry, a French company in the textile sector that specialises in CBRN personal protective equipment

See also